Arf-GAP with coiled-coil, ANK repeat and PH domain-containing protein 1 is a protein that in humans is encoded by the ACAP1 gene.

References

External links

Further reading